Maliattha synochitis, the black-dotted maliattha or black-dotted lithacodia, is an owlet moth in the family Noctuidae. The species was first described by Augustus Radcliffe Grote and Coleman Townsend Robinson in 1868.

The MONA or Hodges number for Maliattha synochitis is 9049.

References

Further reading

External links
 

Eustrotiinae
Articles created by Qbugbot
Moths described in 1868